The Bârnărel is a right tributary of the river Bistrița in Romania. It flows into the Bistrița in Crucea.

References

Rivers of Romania
Rivers of Suceava County